Boynton Hall is a country house in the village of Boynton near Bridlington, East Riding of Yorkshire, England. It is a Grade I listed building.

Originally constructed in the late 16th century, the house has been remodelled several times since. It is built in red brick with stone dressings and a slate roof, originally to an H-shaped plan, but since infilled at the front. Originally a two-storey building, it is now a three-storey building with a 7-bay frontage. The central 5 bays project slightly and have a 3-window polygonal bay.

The Hall stands within an associated park, whose features include a walled garden and the Carnaby Temple folly (known locally as the Pepperpot). Other buildings, such as the Dairy, the Pigeon House and the Lodge, are Grade II listed buildings.

History
The house was acquired in 1549 by William Strickland of Marske, who extended it into an H-shaped building with a central hall. Strickland was reputed to have sailed to America with Sebastian Cabot and to have introduced the turkey to England and was twice MP for Scarborough.

It passed down to his grandson, the Parliamentarian Sir William Strickland, 1st Baronet who was MP for Hedon in the Long Parliament from 1640 to 1653. It descended via Sir William Strickland, 3rd Baronet, MP to Sir William Strickland, 4th Baronet, MP, who commissioned both Lord Burlington and William Kent to carry out work on the Hall. Further modifications were done by the 4th Baronet in 1684. In the 1720 an extra floor was added with a new slate roof and in the 1760s the front of the house was infilled by the York architect John Carr.

The 7th Baronet changed his name to Cholmley in 1865 in order to inherit the estates, including Howsham Hall, of Nathaniel Cholmley, but his son Sir Charles Strickland, 8th Baronet reverted to the traditional surname. The direct Strickland line failed in 1938 on the death of Sir Walter Strickland, 9th Baronet (who had renounced the title and left the country) and the Hall passed to the Strickland-Constable branch of the family. They sold it in the 1950s.

The house was then bought back in the 1980s by a family member, Richard Marriott, and has since been restored.

References

Country houses in the East Riding of Yorkshire
Grade I listed buildings in the East Riding of Yorkshire